opened in Yamagata, Yamagata Prefecture, Japan, in 1964. The Museum's annex opened in 1968. In 1985 the new three-story main building opened; the annex was renovated the following year. The collection includes works by Manet, Monet, Renoir, Cézanne, and Takahashi Yuichi, as well as Yosa Buson's six-panel byōbu of 1779, Oku no Hosomichi (Important Cultural Property).

See also
 Yamagata Prefectural Museum
 Homma Museum of Art
 List of Cultural Properties of Japan - paintings (Yamagata)

References

External links
  Yamagata Museum of Art
  Collection
  Yamagata Museum of Art
  Yoshino Gypsum Art Foundation - Collection

Museums in Yamagata Prefecture
Yamagata, Yamagata
Art museums and galleries in Japan
Museums established in 1964
1964 establishments in Japan